The 1964 Grote Prijs Jef Scherens was the second edition of the Grote Prijs Jef Scherens cycle race and was held on 30 April 1964. The race started and finished in Leuven. The race was won by Norbert Kerckhove.

General classification

References

1964
1964 in road cycling
1964 in Belgian sport